The 99th Regiment Illinois Volunteer Infantry was an infantry regiment that served in the Union Army during the American Civil War.

Service
The 99th Illinois Infantry was organized at Florence, Illinois and mustered into Federal service on August 23, 1862.

The regiment was mustered out on July 31, 1865, and discharged at Springfield, Illinois, on August 9, 1865.

Total strength and casualties
The regiment suffered 4 officers and 47 enlisted men who were killed in action or who died of their wounds 1 officer and 120 enlisted men who died of disease, for a total of 172 fatalities.

Commanders
Colonel George W.K. Bailey - Mustered out December 16, 1864.

See also
List of Illinois Civil War Units
Illinois in the American Civil War
Thomas J. Higgins, a soldier in the 99th Illinois who won the Medal of Honor for his actions during the Battle of Vicksburg.

References

References
The Civil War Archive

Units and formations of the Union Army from Illinois
1862 establishments in Illinois
Military units and formations established in 1862
Military units and formations disestablished in 1865